Filip Rønningen Jørgensen (born 27 May 2002) is a Norwegian professional footballer who plays as a midfielder for Odd.

Career
He grew up in Kragerø IF and made his debut for their senior team, as far down as the seventh tier of Norwegian football. In 2019 he joined Odd's youth system, only to make his first-team debut in June 2020 against Strømsgodset. In his second match, as a substitute, he was described by Nettavisen as "totally dominant". In the next match he was a starter.

References

External links

2002 births
Living people
People from Kragerø
Norwegian footballers
Odds BK players
Eliteserien players
Association football midfielders
Sportspeople from Vestfold og Telemark
Norwegian Second Division players